Joanie Loves Chachi is an American sitcom television series and a spin-off of Happy Days that aired on ABC from March 23, 1982, to May 24, 1983. It stars Erin Moran and Scott Baio as the characters Joanie Cunningham and Chachi Arcola, respectively. The series was cancelled after 17 episodes, in its second season, due to a drop in ratings.

Storyline
The series is set in the early to mid-1960s and follows the exploits of Joanie and Chachi as they moved to Chicago and tried to make it on their own with a rock band and a music career at a time when the British Invasion was looming (one episode was titled "Beatlemania"). It mixed the traditional elements of a sitcom with musical performances on each show by Baio and Moran. In fact, the beginning credit sequence of the show had them singing to each other. Their backup band consists of a spaced-out drummer named Bingo and Chachi's blasé cousins Mario and Annette.

The series also starred Ellen Travolta as Louisa Delvecchio, Chachi's mother, and Al Molinaro as Al Delvecchio, Chachi's stepfather (and formerly the owner of Arnold's Drive-In in Happy Days), who opened a restaurant in which Chachi and Joanie performed most of their music. Art Metrano played Chachi's uncle Rico Mastorelli, who was the band's manager and helped Joanie and Chachi advance in their careers. Winifred Freedman played Rico's daughter, Annette, Chachi's cousin and bandmate.

Like other Garry Marshall related sitcoms such as Happy Days and Laverne & Shirley, Joanie Loves Chachi had its share of anachronisms.  The show was set in the 1960s yet characters were styled in a manner more true to the 1980s.

Production
Joanie Loves Chachi was the first Miller-Boyett (and only Garry Marshall-produced) sitcom developed by Thomas L. Miller and Robert L. Boyett, and was created by Lowell Ganz, Mark Rothman and Garry Marshall. This is the only Garry Marshall/Miller-Boyett sitcom that does not have Charles Fox and/or Norman Gimbel as the show's theme song/music cue composer.

An urban legend circulated that the show was the highest-rated American program ever in Korea due to "chachi" being a Korean word for "penis". In actuality, the show was never broadcast to the general public of Korea, only to U.S. servicemen stationed in South Korea, and has never even been dubbed or subtitled in Korean.

Scott Baio later recalled: All the Happy Days people had written the first four episodes, when the show got picked up for series, but then they left to go back to Happy Days, and we were stuck with new writers who didn’t know us. So that was a problem. And then some of the people on the show had chemical issues, and that was a problem. It was just on and on and on, and it just sort of all crumbled and fell apart. In retrospect, if given the choice again, I would not have done that show. That was just the wrong idea. If I had to do it all over again, I would’ve waited ’til Happy Days was over until I did anything else. [emphasis in original]

Cast

Episodes

Season 1 (1982)

Season 2 (1982–1983)

Home media
On February 4, 2014, CBS DVD (distributed by Paramount) released Joanie Loves Chachi - The Complete Series on DVD in Region 1.

Reception
The show debuted as a mid-season replacement and initially attracted high ratings, benefiting from two factors: it aired immediately following its parent series, Happy Days, and had only reruns competing for its time slot. The ratings plummeted in Season 2 with a move to Thursday nights, which put Joanie Loves Chachi up against The A-Team, and it was pulled from the schedule by the year's end. The characters were rolled back into Happy Days for that program's final season. ABC determined that the show was losing too much of its lead-in, suggesting low appeal if the show were moved.

In 2010, TV Guide Network listed the show at #17 on its list of 25 Biggest TV Blunders.

US TV Ratings

In popular media
The show is referenced in The Dead Milkmen song, "Swordfish" from their debut album Big Lizard in My Backyard, released 1 June 1985. The second verse includes the line, "I believe in Joanie Loves Crotchie".

In the pilot episode of Friends, taped on 4 May 1994, Rachel Green is watching the Happy Days episode of the main characters’ wedding after she breaks up with her fiancé Barry. She says, "See! But Joanie loved Chachi! That's the difference!"

On the Beastie Boys track "Get It Together", released on 17 March 1994, guest vocalist Q-Tip likens band member Ad Rock's close relationship with his then-wife Ione Skye to that of "Chachi and Joanie"; Ad Rock himself then replies, in rhyme, "'Cause she's the cheese and I'm the macaroni!"

In the series Cybill, starring Cybill Shepherd as a character with her own first name is a failing actress, she frequently refers to her role on Joanie Loves Chachi although the actress did not appear on the show.

The show is referenced in the film A Night at the Roxbury (1998) where the owner of the Roxbury opens a bottle of wine from 1980, a woman says "1980, a good year" then Butabi says "Yeah, that was when Joanie Loves Chachi premiered" another woman named Cambi says "Yeah, yeah, Joanie Loves Chachi, but does Chachi give a flyin' f**k bout Joanie?".

The show was referenced twice on Family Guy, in the episode "Death Has a Shadow" (1999) a clip of the show was seen on TV's Bloopers & Practical Jokes, where Baio (as Chachi) tries to recite the tongue-twister "Susie Sells by the Sea Shore" and gets mauled by a bear. In the episode "Save the Clam" (2013), the guys are stuck at Peter Griffin's house drinking while watching an episode of "Joanie Loves Chris Brown" on television.

The show is referenced in the Bloodhound Gang song, "Yummy Down on This", from their third studio album, Hooray for Boobies (released on 29 October 2000).

In 2002, an episode of the nostalgic documentary series I Love the 80s mentioned "Joanie Loves Chachi" as a topic.

In the film DodgeBall: A True Underdog Story (2004) when White Goodman (played by Ben Stiller) hits Justin with a dodgeball, he says "Joanie loves Chachi!"

In Jason Mraz's 2018 song "Unlonely", Mraz references Chachi and Joanie in the line, "We could keep it sweet like Chachi and Joanie".

References

External links
 
 
 Joanie Loves Chachi at Sitcomsonline.com

1982 American television series debuts
1983 American television series endings
1980s American sitcoms
American Broadcasting Company original programming
American television spin-offs
English-language television shows
Happy Days
Television series about show business
Television series by CBS Studios
Television series set in the 1960s
Television shows set in Chicago